Route 8 is a  state highway in Connecticut that runs north–south from Bridgeport, through Waterbury, all the way to the Massachusetts state line where it continues as Massachusetts Route 8. Most of the highway is a four-lane freeway but the northernmost  is a two-lane surface road.

Route description

Route 8 begins at Interstate 95 (I-95) exit 27A in Bridgeport. The first  through Bridgeport runs concurrently with the freeway portion of Route 25. Approaching the split between Routes 8 and 25, the road expands to six, eight, and even ten lanes. Route 8 continues northeastward into Trumbull where there is an interchange with the Merritt Parkway.

From Trumbull, it briefly enters Stratford before entering Shelton passing by several exits providing access to business parks. It then crosses the Housatonic River and continues into Derby. After the Route 34 interchange, the road takes on more of a semi-rural character as it winds its way along the Naugatuck River through the towns of Ansonia, Seymour, and Beacon Falls before it becomes more suburban in nature in Naugatuck and then more urban as it enters Waterbury. In Waterbury, Route 8 meets with I-84 at the interchange known locally as the "Mixmaster". After the Route 73 interchange, the road returns to its winding semi-rural nature, passing through Watertown and Thomaston. In the latter city, U.S. Route 6 (US 6) briefly overlaps for about a mile. The highway then continues through Litchfield and Harwinton. After a brief suburban section through Torrington where it intersects US 202 and Route 4, it returns to a rural freeway before entering the town of Winchester.

The freeway portion of Route 8 ends at US 44 and Route 183 in Winsted. After a short  northwesterly overlap with US 44 and Route 183, Route 8 continues north as a mostly rural surface road. It intersects the western end of Route 20 on the northern edge of town, and continues through Colebrook to the Massachusetts state line, becoming Massachusetts Route 8 upon entering Sandisfield.

The section from I-95 to the Route 25 split is also known as the Colonel Henry Mucci Highway (designation continues on Route 25). The section from Shelton to Beacon Falls is known as the General Samuel Jaskilka Highway. The section from Constitution Boulevard in Shelton to Route 334 at the Seymour–Ansonia town line is known as the Ansonia–Derby–Shelton Expressway. The section from Waterbury to the freeway end in Winchester is known as the James H. Darcey Memorial Highway.

History

Most of the alignment of Route 8 was part of an improved toll road known as the Waterbury River Turnpike, which ran from Naugatuck, via Torrington, Winchester Center and Colebrook Center, to the Massachusetts state line. The turnpike was chartered in 1801 and collected tolls until 1862. Two other sections of Route 8 were also old turnpikes: the portion north of Torrington was known as the Still River Turnpike chartered in 1815; the portion between Seymour and Naugatuck was known as the Humphreysville and Salem Turnpike chartered in 1825.

In 1922, the six New England states began a region-wide highway numbering system. The trunk highway from Stratford through Waterbury to the Massachusetts state line became part of the multi-state New England Route 8. Route 8 remained unchanged in the 1932 state highway renumbering. The main road connecting Bridgeport and Shelton (following Noble Avenue, Huntington Turnpike, Shelton Road, Bridgeport Avenue, and Center Street), which was designated as State Highway 316 in 1922, was renumbered as Route 65 in the 1932 renumbering.

In 1951, the Ansonia–Derby–Shelton Expressway portion between Constitution Boulevard in Shelton and Pershing Drive in Derby (including the Commodore Isaac Hull Memorial Bridge) opened to traffic. As part of the freeway upgrades to Route 8, the southern terminus was shifted west from Stratford to Bridgeport, taking over old Route 65. The original southern end of Route 8 was assigned to an extended Route 110. By 1957, the entire length of the Ansonia–Derby–Shelton Expressway portion was open, with the extension from Pershing Drive to Route 334 at the Ansonia/Seymour town line complete.

In the 1960s and 1970s additional sections of the Route 8 freeway opened in stages: in 1960, the segment from Route 63 to South Main Street in Waterbury opened; in 1962, the section from Route 334 to Route 67, including the elevated highway portion through central Seymour, opened; in 1966, the Mixmaster interchange with I-84 is completed and the freeway was also extended to Route 262 in Watertown. An additional section from Route 118 in Litchfield to Kennedy Drive in Torrington also opened. By 1970, the portion from Route 262 in Watertown to Route 118 in Litchfield opened. By 1972, the segment from I-95 to Route 108 in Trumbull, including the overlap with Route 25, was completed. The freeway was also extended from Kennedy Drive in Torrington to its present terminus at Route 44 in Winsted. By 1975, the freeway was completed between Huntington Turnpike at the Trumbull/Shelton town line to Constitution Boulevard in Shelton.

The early 1980s saw the completion of the Route 8 freeway with the 4-lane surface route from Route 67 in Seymour to Route 63 in Naugatuck (originally built in the 1940s) upgraded to a freeway, including the portion that bypasses Beacon Falls. The original alignment of Route 8 through Beacon Falls became part of Route 42. The last segment of freeway between Route 108 in Trumbull and Huntington Turnpike, including a new interchange with the Merritt Parkway was completed in 1982. This constituted the completion of the freeway from Bridgeport to Winchester, 35 years after construction began.

Attempts at Interstate designation
The Route 8 freeway was envisioned to continue beyond its present northern terminus in Winsted to either Massachusetts or southern Vermont. In 1972, Massachusetts and Connecticut requested an interstate designation for the Route 8 corridor that included completed and yet-to-be-built sections in both states. That request was denied by the Federal Highway Administration.

In the ensuing 40 years, on-and-off discussions and engineering studies to designate Route 8 as an interstate route have continued, with the most recent study being completed in 2011. In that report, the study noted that not all of the Route 8 freeway meets interstate standards, particularly sections that were designed and built before the interstate highway era. Newer sections between Bridgeport and Shelton, around Beacon Falls, and from the I-84 interchange in Waterbury to Winsted were designed and built from the late 1960s to the early 1980s and either meet interstate standards or require minimal spot upgrades to meet interstate standards. The report noted the sections that do not meet interstate standards include the 8-mile segment from Shelton to Seymour, which was built in stages from the late 1940s through the early 1960s; and the 5-mile section through Naugatuck, which was built in the 1950s. Both of these segments include narrow cross-sections, tight curve radii, and closely spaced interchanges that do not meet current interstate standards. Because these segments wind their way through the urban centers of Shelton, Derby, Seymour and Naugatuck on elevated viaducts, upgrading (or bypassing) these segments would be costly and cause significant disruption to the surrounding communities.

Exit list
CTDOT will be renumbering the exits to mile-based exit numbers as part of a sign replacement that will be taking along most of this corridor in Winter 2022.

See also

References

External links

kurumi.com - CT Route 8
nycroads.com - CT 8 Expressway

Freeways in the United States
008
Transportation in Fairfield County, Connecticut
Transportation in New Haven County, Connecticut
Transportation in Litchfield County, Connecticut